Procalyptis albanyensis is a species of moth of the  family Tortricidae. It is found in Australia, where it has been recorded from Western Australia.

References

	

Moths described in 1924
Archipini